Notopala sublineata is a species of large, freshwater snail with an operculum, an aquatic gastropod mollusk in the family Viviparidae, the river snails or mystery snails. This species is endemic to Australia.

Subspecies 
There are three subspecies of Notopala sublineata:
 Notopala sublineata sublineata Conrad, 1850
 Notopala sublineata alisoni
 Notopala sublineata hanleyi (Frauenfeld, 1864)

References

Viviparidae
Endangered fauna of Australia
Gastropods of Australia
Taxa named by Timothy Abbott Conrad
Taxonomy articles created by Polbot
Freshwater molluscs of Oceania